"Love Enough for Two" was the  entry in the Eurovision Song Contest 1980, performed in English by Prima Donna. The song is uptempo and about the love between two people. It was the second of two UK Eurovision entries written by Stephanie de Sykes and Stuart Slater.

At Eurovision
The song was performed 13th on the night, following 's Katja Ebstein with "Theater" and preceding 's José Cid with "Um grande, grande amor". At the close of voting, it had received 106 points, placing 3rd in a field of 19.

It was succeeded as British representative at the 1981 contest by Bucks Fizz with "Making Your Mind Up".

Charts

References

1980 songs
Eurovision songs of 1980
Eurovision songs of the United Kingdom
Ariola Records singles
1980 singles
Songs written by Stephanie de Sykes